Bani Ziad is a sub-district located in the Shar'ab ar-Rawnah District, Taiz Governorate, Yemen. Bani Ziad had a population of 6,999 according to the 2004 census.

References

Sub-districts in Shar'ab ar-Rawnah District